Mike Castaneda Pena (November 6, 1924 – September 5, 1950) was a U.S. Army veteran of World War II and the Korean War, and a recipient of the Medal of Honor for his actions at the Battle of Tabu-dong.

Biographical details
Pena was born in Corpus Christi, Texas on November 6, 1924, into a Mexican American family. He joined the U. S. Army as an infantryman in 1941 when he was 16 years old.  He served in both World War II and the Korean War.

Medal of Honor
The bestowal of the Medal recognized Pena's actions on the evening of Sept. 4, 1950, near Waegwan, Korea during the Battle of Tabu-dong, when his unit was fiercely attacked. During the course of the counter-attack, Pena realized that their ammunition was running out, and ordered his unit to retreat. Pena then manned a machine-gun to cover their withdrawal and single-handedly held back the enemy until morning when his position was overrun and he was killed.

Pena received the Medal of Honor posthumously in 2014.

The award came through the Defense Authorization Act which called for a review of Jewish American and Hispanic American veterans from World War II, the Korean War and the Vietnam War to ensure that no prejudice was shown to those deserving the Medal of Honor.

Medal of Honor citation
'''

Honors and awards
In addition to receiving the Medal of Honor, Pena received:
 Bronze Star Medal
 Purple Heart with one Bronze Oak Leaf Cluster
 Army Good Conduct Medal with Bronze Clasp and two Loops
 American Campaign Medal
 Asiatic-Pacific Campaign Medal with four Bronze Service Stars
 Bronze Arrowhead Device
 World War II Victory Medal
 Army of Occupation Medal with Japan Clasp
 National Defense Service Medal
 Korean Service Medal with one Bronze Service Star
 Presidential Unit Citation
 Combat Infantryman Badge (2nd Award)
 Honorable Service Lapel Button- World War II
 Philippine Liberation Ribbon
 Philippine Independence Ribbon
 United Nations Service Medal
 Republic of Korea-Korean War Service Medal
 Philippine Presidential Unit Citation
 Republic of Korea Presidential Unit Citation
 Gold Bravery Medal of Greece Unit Citation

References

See also
 List of Korean War Medal of Honor recipients

1924 births
1950 deaths
American military personnel killed in the Korean War
United States Army personnel of World War II
United States Army Medal of Honor recipients
United States Army non-commissioned officers
Korean War recipients of the Medal of Honor
American people of Mexican descent
United States Army personnel of the Korean War